C. J. Allen is a British television and stage actor, active from 1982 to 2006.

Stage
From 3 November 1982 he starred opposite Eamon Boland, Clive Mantle, Philip Donaghy and Ian McCurrach in David Hayman’s award winning stage production of Coming Clean at the Bush Theatre in London, playing the role of William. The play explored themes of homosexuality and gay culture, an innovative subject matter for its era, and was one of the first winners of the Samuel Beckett Award.

Television
Following several walk-on parts in earlier years, his television career flourished from 1982 with minor (single-episode) roles in significant productions The Gentle Touch, The Professionals, and Whoops Apocalypse.

The following year he achieved his first starring television role as PC Brian Kelleher, a primary character in the ground-breaking television series Juliet Bravo, in its re-launched format with a new lead character, Inspector Kate Longton (played by Anna Carteret). The programme was an early portrayal of the emerging area of senior female police officers, and explored themes relating to women in male-dominated culture. Carteret took the lead role for series 4–6, and Allen appeared alongside her in 41 of those 44 episodes, commencing from series 4, episode 1.

Allen had subsequent roles in the second series of children's series Simon and the Witch (1988), and in all three series of ITV Central comedy A Kind of Living (1988–1990). Since that time he has had occasional appearances in many television series, including Mr. Bean and London's Burning, but has not returned to any leading character roles.

References

External links
 Photograph of Allen and the Juliet Bravo cast at Daily Express newspaper.
 Photograph of Allen and the Juliet Bravo cast at Alamy stock photos.
 

British male stage actors
Living people
Year of birth missing (living people)
Place of birth missing (living people)
British male television actors